XHEXA-FM is a Spanish & English Top 40 (CHR) radio station that serves Mexico City and states surrounding the federal district. Broadcasting on 104.9 MHz, XHEXA-FM is owned by MVS Radio and is the flagship station of the Exa FM format.

History
XHBST-FM signed on in 1974, owned by the same Stereorey consortium that brought FM to major Mexican cities on stations such as XHV-FM 102.5 Mexico City and XHSRO-FM in Monterrey. It carried the "Stereo Best" format, which was very similar. Not long after, it changed formats completely to "FM Globo", a name it would use with varying formats including romantic music, Spanish pop and contemporary music. The station changed its callsign to XHMRD-FM on October 8, 1991, and on January 1, 2000, changed its name to "Exa FM", with a Top 40 CHR format, its name alluding to the format of airing blocks of six consecutive songs. Its callsign was later changed to XHEXA-FM  to reflect its new name. The callsign had been in use for a brief time on an MVS Radio station in Hermosillo, Sonora, which returned to the XHBH-FM callsign when the XHEXA calls moved to Mexico City.

References

External links 
 Official Site of XHEXA-FM 104.9 MHz, Exa FM
 MVS Radio Website
 Exa FM 104.9 Facebook

Contemporary hit radio stations in Mexico
Spanish-language radio stations
Radio stations in Mexico City
MVS Radio